Yassine Salhi (born 3 November 1987) is a Moroccan professional footballer who plays as a forward for Raja Beni Mellal.

International career
Salhi won the 2012 Arab Nations Cup with Morocco as the tournament's top scorer with six goals.

Career statistics

Club

International

Honours
Raja Casablanca
 Botola: 2010-11, 2012-13
 Coupe du Trône: 2012
FIFA Club World Cup runner-up: 2013

Kuwait SC
 Kuwait Emir Cup: 2016
Morocco
 Arab Nations Cup: 2012
Individual
Best player of the Arab Cup:2012
top scorer of the Arab Cup:2012

References

External links

 
 
 

1987 births
Living people
Moroccan footballers
Moroccan expatriate footballers
Footballers from Casablanca
Raja CA players
Racing de Casablanca players
Kuwait SC players
Moghreb Tétouan players
Al Dhafra FC players
Al Urooba Club players
Botola players
Kuwait Premier League players
UAE Pro League players
UAE First Division League players
Association football forwards
Moroccan expatriate sportspeople in Kuwait
Moroccan expatriate sportspeople in the United Arab Emirates
Expatriate footballers in Kuwait
Expatriate footballers in the United Arab Emirates